Unireso is the umbrella organization for a common tariff system for a network of various modes of public transportation in and around Geneva, Switzerland.

Members 
 Transports publics genevois (TPG)
 Swiss Federal Railways (SBB-CFF-FFS)
 Mouettes genevoises navigation (MGN)
 Transports publics de la région nyonnaise (TPN)
 Transports annemassiens collectifs (TAC)
 Transport express régional (TER)

External links

 Unireso website 

Public transport in Switzerland
Transport in Geneva
Organisations based in Geneva